François Lesure (23 May 1923 in Paris – 21 June 2001) was a French librarian and  musicologist.

Biography 
François Lesure studied at the Sorbonne, the École nationale des chartes (graduated in 1950), the École pratique des hautes études (graduated in 1948) and the Conservatoire de Paris. In 1950, he became curator in the music department of the Bibliothèque nationale de France, which he directed from 1970 to 1988. Between 1964 and 1977, he was appointed professor of musicology at the Université libre de Bruxelles. He succeeded Solange Corbin to the chair of musicology at the École pratique des Hautes Études in 1973.

François Lesure organized major exhibitions at the Bibliothèque nationale and the Opéra de Paris (Mozart in 1956, Debussy in 1962, Berlioz in 1969, Deux siècles d'opéra français in 1972) and at the Villa Médicis in  Rome (Debussy et le symbolisme in 1984).

He is mainly remembered as a specialist in 16th-century music, music sociology, music bibliography and Debussy.

Between 1953 and 1967 he worked at the Central Secretariat of the RISM, a global project for the identification of musical sources. He has also edited several volumes in the RISM collections. He was also editor of Claude Debussy's "complete works". A volume of Festschriften was offered to him in 1988 upon his departure from the Bibliothèque Nationale, entitled Musiques, signes, images, which gathered contributions both international and from researchers or artists in various fields.

Main publications

16th century 
 Anthologie de la chanson parisienne au XVIe (Monaco, 1953)
 With Tillman Merritt: Clément Janequin, Chansons polyphoniques (Monaco, 1965).
 With Geneviève Thibault: Bibliographie des éditions musicales publiées par Nicolas Du Chemin (1549-1576). In Annales musicologiques 1 (1953) (pp. 269–273) + suppl.
 With Geneviève Thibault: Bibliographie des éditions d'Adrian Le Roy et Robert Ballard (1551-1598). Paris: Société française de musicologie, 1955.
 Some minor french composers of the sixteenth century, in Aspects of Medieval and Renaissance Music, ed. Jan LaRue (New York, 1966).
 Musique et musiciens français du XVIe, Geneva, Minkoff, 1976 [collections of earlier articles].
 La Facture instrumentale à Paris au seizième siècle, in The Galpin Society Journal 7 (1954), (pp. 11–52).

17th and 18th centuries 
 Les luthistes parisiens à l'époque de Louis XIII. In Le luth et sa musique, [proceedings of the symposium of Neuilly-sur-Seine, 10–14 September 1957, éd. Jean Jacquot]. Second edition revised and corrected. - Paris, 1976. (Colloques internationaux du CNRS, 511),.
 Documents inédits relatifs au luthiste Gabriel Bataille (vers 1575-1630). In  29 (1947).
 Die Terpsichore von Michael Praetorius und die französische Instrumentalmusik unter Heinrich IV, in Die Musikforschung 5 (1952).
 Le Recueil de ballets de Michel Henry, in Jean Jacquot (éd.) Les Fêtes de la Renaissance (Paris, 1956, (pp. 205-211).)
 Inventaire des livres de musique de la Chapelle royale de Bruxelles en 1607. In Revue belge de Musicologie 5 (1951), (pp. 34-35).
 Histoire d'une édition posthume : les Airs de Sébastien Le Camus (1678). In Revue belge de Musicologie, 8 (1954), (pp. 126-129).
 Bibliographie des éditions musicales publiées par Estienne Roger et Michel-Charles le Cène (Amsterdam, 1696-1743). Paris, 1969.

 Musical bibliography 
 Dictionnaire des éditeurs de musique français, with Anik Devriès (3 volumes, 1979-1988)
 RISM B/I : Recueils imprimés XVIe–XVIIe, under the direction of F. Lesure. Munich, 1960.
 RISM B/II : Recueils imprimés XVIIIe, under the direction of F. Lesure. Munich, 1964. With a supplément in Notes Second Series 28/3 (1972), (pp. 393-418).
 [see also above the bibliographies of the publishers Le Roy et Ballard, Du Chemin et Roger].

 About Claude Debussy 
 Catalogue des œuvres (Geneva, 1977), with an overview of all Debussy's compositions
 Iconographie et lettres by Debussy (1980)
 Claude Debussy avant "Pelléas" ou les Années symbolistes (1993)
 Claude Debussy (1994), biography.

 Sociology of music 
 Dictionnaire musical des villes de province (Paris, 1999)
 Pour une sociologie historique des faits musicaux. In Report of the Eighth Congress of the International Musicological Society (New York, 1961), Kassel, 1961, (pp. 333–346)

 References 

 External links 
 François Lesure on Symétrie
 Laurent Guillo. Archives seiziémistes de François Lesure : inventaire et transcription partielle''. PDF, 179 p. Paris, May 2017. Available on NAKALA: Archives seiziémistes de François Lesure : inventaire et transcription partielle
 François Lesure on Fayard
 François Lesure on Encyclopedia Universalis
 François Lesure on Book-Node
 Musicologie by François Lesure on Persée
 François Lesure on AbeBooks
 Catalogue François Lesure des œuvres de Claude Debussy on Musicbrainz

Writers from Paris
1923 births
2001 deaths
20th-century French musicologists
Conservatoire de Paris alumni
École Nationale des Chartes alumni
École pratique des hautes études alumni
French librarians
Chevaliers of the Légion d'honneur
Knights of the Ordre national du Mérite
Commandeurs of the Ordre des Arts et des Lettres
Presidents of the Société française de musicologie
Debussy scholars